Ephraim Taukafa (born 26 June 1976) is a Tongan rugby union footballer who now coaches in Dijon, France.

He played for Chalon-sur-Saône, and Stade Montois in France. Previously he played for North Harbour in New Zealand, Northern Suburbs in Australia, Leicester Tigers in England and Oyonnax (France) and Lyon OU in France. He played for the Tonga national team at the 2003, 2007 and 2011 Rugby World Cup.

In April 2021 he became forwards coach for Stade Nantais. In June 2022 he became assistant coach of Stade Niortais.

References

External links

1976 births
Living people
Rugby union hookers
Leicester Tigers players
Tonga international rugby union players
New Zealand sportspeople of Tongan descent
New Zealand expatriate rugby union players
Expatriate rugby union players in France
Expatriate rugby union players in England
New Zealand expatriate sportspeople in France
New Zealand expatriate sportspeople in England
Expatriate rugby union players in Australia
New Zealand expatriate sportspeople in Australia